St-Pierre-Jolys (Carl's Field) Aerodrome  is located  east of St-Pierre-Jolys, Manitoba, Canada.

References

Registered aerodromes in Manitoba